Lichenopeltella cetrariicola is a species of lichenicolous fungus belonging to the class Dothideomycetes. It has been reported from Europe and Iceland but it probably has a more widespread distribution. It has been reported from at least two host species, Cetraria islandica and Cetraria aculeata.

References

Dothideomycetes
Fungi described in 1989
Fungi of Europe
Lichenicolous fungi
Taxa named by William Nylander (botanist)
Fungi of Iceland